Erasmo Jesus de Sequeira (1938/1939 - 16 July 1997) was an Indian politician, social worker and parliamentarian from Goa. He represented the Marmagoa parliamentary constituency twice from 1967–1977. He has been described as a "man of letters"; and was known for his fluency in many languages.

Personal life
Erasmo de Sequeria was the son of Dr. Jack de Sequeira and Lilia Margarida de Gouveia  Pinto. His father was the founder of the United Goans Party and also the first Leader of Opposition in the Goa assembly.  He is popularly known as the Father of the Opinion Poll in Goa.

Sequeira married Maureen and they had three children Dr Amita de Sequeira, Dr Anil de Sequeira and Aisha de Sequeira.

Role in the Goa Opinion Poll
The United Goans Party was the main proponent of a referendum on the issue of merger of Goa with Maharashtra. During the Goa Opinion Poll, Jack and Erasmo were the leaders of the anti-merger faction. Sequeira pasted posters in the dead of the night. He conducted meetings with other activists to plan strategies. He did the legwork that his father required of him.

Political career
Erasmo de Sequeira was the leader of the United Goans Party (Sequeira Group); which was founded by his father. He represented Marmagoa parliamentary constituency twice between 1967-1977. He was also a member of the Parliamentary Estimates Committee between 1968-69.

During his term as a Member of Parliament, he advocated greater links with Latin America. He was made the leader of Parliamentary delegations to foreign countries many times; especially when the delegations were sent to Spanish and Portuguese speaking countries.

Although Erasmo was a member of the Opposition, he was known to be on good terms with Prime Minister Indira Gandhi. During the Emergency, a large number of Opposition leaders were arrested. Erasmo de Sequeria was a notable exception. He became the Opposition's voice in the Parliament.

On one occasion, Indira Gandhi invited Sequeira to join the Congress. She assured him that he would be made a Deputy Minister. When he refused, she offered to make him a Minister of State. He refused again, saying that he aimed higher. Indira told him that she could not make him a Cabinet Minister due to his lack of experience. Sequeira replied that he did not want that either. When Indira finally asked Sequeira what he wanted he replied, "Your chair, madam, your chair!".

Second split in UGP
In 1977, Sequeira joined hands with the Bharatiya Lok Dal, headed by Charan Singh. He did this without consulting his party members. The party members were enraged, causing the UGP (Sequiera group) to split into two groups: UGP (Sequeria Group) and UGP (Naik Group). He lost the next parliamentary election to Eduardo Faleiro of UGP-N in March 1977. In the next Assembly elections, UGP-S managed to win just three seats as compared to UGP-N, which won 10 seats.

Writer
Sequeira was a prolific writer of letters. He was fluent in many Indian and foreign languages. His publications include My Country and Me. He authored many poems in English. He also started a paper called the Goa Monitor in 1977.

Death
Erasmo de Sequeira died in Goa on 16 July 1997.

See also
 United Goans Party
 Jack de Sequeira
 Goa Opinion Poll

References

1930s births
1997 deaths
India MPs 1967–1970
India MPs 1971–1977
Lok Sabha members from Goa
People from Mormugao
United Goans Party politicians
Bharatiya Lok Dal politicians
Janata Party politicians